Marat Soslanovich Tsallagov (born 23 March 1982) is a Russian former footballer who played as defender.

External links
 
 

1982 births
Sportspeople from Vladikavkaz
Living people
Russian footballers
Association football defenders
Russian expatriate footballers
Expatriate footballers in Belarus
Russian Premier League players
FC Elista players
FC Spartak Vladikavkaz players
FC Chernomorets Novorossiysk players
FC Torpedo-BelAZ Zhodino players
FC Mashuk-KMV Pyatigorsk players